Jens van Son (born 19 August 1987) is a Dutch former professional footballer who played as a midfielder. He formerly played for FC Eindhoven, FC Den Bosch, Sparta Rotterdam, Roda JC Kerkrade and Fortuna Sittard.

References

External links
 
 Career stats & Profile - Voetbal International

1987 births
People from Valkenswaard
Footballers from North Brabant
Living people
Dutch footballers
Association football midfielders
VV De Valk players
FC Eindhoven players
Sparta Rotterdam players
Roda JC Kerkrade players
Fortuna Sittard players
FC Den Bosch players
Eredivisie players
Eerste Divisie players